Liu Congcong (born ) is a Chinese female volleyball player. She was part of the China women's national volleyball team.

She participated in the 2013 FIVB Volleyball World Grand Prix.
On club level she played for Army in 2013.

References

External links
 Profile at FIVB.org

1990 births
Living people
Chinese women's volleyball players
Place of birth missing (living people)
21st-century Chinese women